I'm Happy, and I'm Singing, and a 1, 2, 3, 4 is an album by American musician Jim O'Rourke. It was released by the label Mego in December 2001.

In 2017, Pitchfork placed it at number 28 on its list of "The 50 Best IDM Albums of All Time".

Track listing

References

2001 albums
Jim O'Rourke (musician) albums
Intelligent dance music albums
Glitch (music) albums